Stefano Callegari may refer to:

 Stefano Callegari (chef), Italian chef
 Stefano Callegari (footballer), Argentine footballer